Behind the Mask is a 1958 British drama film directed by Brian Desmond Hurst and starring Michael Redgrave, Ian Bannen and Lionel Jeffries. It portrays the life of a surgeon in a busy hospital.

Redgrave's daughter, Vanessa Redgrave, made her film debut in this movie.

Cast
 Michael Redgrave as Sir Arthur Benson Gray 
 Tony Britton as Philip Selwood 
 Carl Möhner as Dr Carl Romek 
 Niall MacGinnis as Neil Isherwood 
 Vanessa Redgrave as Pamela Benson Gray 
 Ian Bannen as Alan Crabtree 
 Brenda Bruce as Elizabeth Fallon 
 Lionel Jeffries as Walter Froy 
 Miles Malleson as Sir Oswald Pettiford 
 John Welsh as Col. Langley 
 Ann Firbank as Mrs Judson 
 Jack Hedley as Dr Galbraith 
 Hugh Miller as Examiner 
 Mary Skinner as Theatre Sister 
 Margaret Tyzack as Night Sister

References

External links
 Behind the Mask  at the website dedicated to Brian Desmond Hurst
 

1958 films
British drama films
1958 drama films
Films directed by Brian Desmond Hurst
Films set in hospitals
1950s English-language films
1950s British films